Marko Jemec (born 3 August 1963) is a Slovenian freestyle skier. He competed in the men's moguls event at the 1992 Winter Olympics.

References

1963 births
Living people
Slovenian male freestyle skiers
Olympic freestyle skiers of Slovenia
Freestyle skiers at the 1992 Winter Olympics
Skiers from Ljubljana
20th-century Slovenian people